Kuntur Qaqa (Quechua kuntur condor, qaqa rock, "condor rock", also spelled Condor Khakha) is a  mountain in the Bolivian Andes. It is located in the Potosí Department, Chayanta Province, Ravelo Municipality, southeast of Ravelo.

References 

Mountains of Potosí Department